Javad (جواد) is a Persian variant of male given name Jawad meaning generous.
People with this name include:

First name 
Javad Daraei (born 1992) Iranian filmmaker 
Javad Bushehri (1893–1972), Iranian businessman and politician
Javad Owji (born 1966), Iranian oil engineer and politician
Javad Sadr (1912–1990), Iranian diplomat and politician

Middle name 
Mohammad Javad Tondguyan (1893–1972), Iranian engineer and politician
Mohammad Javad Zarif (born 1960), Iranian politician

See also
 Javad (disambiguation)